The men's team foil was one of seven fencing events on the Fencing at the 1928 Summer Olympics programme. It was the fourth appearance of the event. The competition was held from 29 July 1928 to 30 July 1928. 88 fencers from 16 nations competed.

Rosters

Argentina
 Roberto Larraz
 Raúl Anganuzzi
 Luis Lucchetti
 Héctor Lucchetti
 Carmelo Camet

Austria
 Richard Brünner
 Ernst Baylon
 Kurt Ettinger
 Hans Lion
 Hans Schönbaumsfeld
 Rudolf Berger

Belgium
 Max Janlet
 Pierre Pêcher
 Raymond Bru
 Albert De Roocker
 Jean Verbrugge
 Charles Crahay

Denmark
 Ivan Osiier
 Jens Berthelsen
 Kim Bærentzen
 Johan Praem

Egypt
 Joseph Misrahi
 Abu Bakr Ratib
 Mahmoud Abdin
 Saul Moyal
 Salvator Cicurel

France
 Philippe Cattiau
 Roger Ducret
 André Labatut
 Lucien Gaudin
 Raymond Flacher
 André Gaboriaud

Germany
 Erwin Casmir
 Fritz Gazzera
 Julius Thomson
 Wilhelm Löffler
 August Heim
 Heinrich Moos

Great Britain
 Thomas Wand-Tetley
 Robert Montgomerie
 Frederick Sherriff
 Denis Pearce
 Charles Simey
 Jack Evan James

Hungary
 Ödön von Tersztyánszky
 György Rozgonyi
 György Piller-Jekelfalussy
 József Rády
 Gusztáv Kálniczky
 Péter Tóth

Italy
 Ugo Pignotti
 Giulio Gaudini
 Giorgio Pessina
 Gioacchino Guaragna
 Oreste Puliti
 Giorgio Chiavacci

Netherlands
 Frans Mosman
 Doris de Jong
 Nicolaas Nederpeld
 Paul Kunze
 Wouter Brouwer
 Otto Schiff

Norway
 Jacob Bergsland
 Johan Falkenberg
 Frithjof Lorentzen
 Sigurd Akre-Aas

Romania
 Nicolae Caranfil
 Dan Gheorghiu
 Gheorghe Caranfil
 Mihai Savu
 Ion Rudeanu

Spain
 Diego Díez
 Domingo García
 Juan Delgado
 Félix de Pomés
 Fernando García

Switzerland
 Édouard Fitting
 Frédéric Fitting
 Eugène Empeyta
 John Albaret
 Michel Fauconnet
 Jean de Bardel

United States
 George Calnan
 René Peroy
 Joe Levis
 Harold Rayner
 Henry Breckinridge
 Dernell Every

Results
Source: Official results; De Wael

Round 1

Each pool was a round-robin.  Bouts were to five touches, and each fencer from one nation had a bout against each from the opponent.  The nation which won the most individual bouts took the team bout (with total touches as the tie-breaker if the teams split 8-8).  The top two nations in each pool advanced to the second round.

Round 2

Each pool was a round-robin.  Bouts were to five touches, and each fencer from one nation had a bout against each from the opponent.  The nation which won the most individual bouts took the team bout (with total touches as the tie-breaker if the teams split 8-8).  The top two nations in each pool advanced to the semifinals.

Semifinals

Each pool was a round-robin.  Bouts were to five touches, and each fencer from one nation had a bout against each from the opponent.  The nation which won the most individual bouts took the team bout (with total touches as the tie-breaker if the teams split 8-8).  The top two nations in each pool advanced to the final.  In the first pool, the United States lost the first two matches making the match between France and Italy unnecessary as both would advance regardless of the result.  Similarly, Hungary lost both the first two matches of the second pool, so the third match (between Argentina and Belgium) was unnecessary.

Final

The final was a round-robin.  Bouts were to five touches, and each fencer from one nation had a bout against each from the opponent.  The nation which won the most individual bouts took the team bout (with total touches as the tie-breaker if the teams split 8-8).  The match between France and Belgium finished 8(62) to 8(62).

References

Foil team
Men's events at the 1928 Summer Olympics